Emsland Gymnasium is a Gymnasium (secondary) school in Rheine, North Rhine-Westphalia, Germany. It was founded in 1853.

History

Founded as a girls' school, the school became co-educational in 1972.

Notable alumni
Monika Hermanns, judge
Gerda Hövel, Member of the Parliament of Lower Saxony
Gudrun J. Klinker, computer scientist
Rita Süssmuth, politician and former President of the Bundestag

External links
Emsland Gymnasium

Schools in North Rhine-Westphalia
1853 establishments in Germany
Educational institutions established in 1853
Rheine